Contomastix lacertoides, Bibron's whiptail, is a species of teiid lizard found in Uruguay and Brazil.

References

lacertoides
Reptiles described in 1839
Taxa named by André Marie Constant Duméril
Taxa named by Gabriel Bibron